Glycyrrhiza inflata is a plant species in the genus Glycyrrhiza from China, with common name Chinese licorice.  A related species, G. uralensis, however, is more likely the licorice species one finds in traditional Chinese medicine.

Licochalcone A, licochalcone B and licochalcone D are chalconoids isolated from root of G. inflata as well as glycyrrhizin.

References

External links 

inflata
Plants described in 1891